The Popular Front for the Liberation of Palestine – External Operations (PFLP-EO) or Special Operations (PFLP-SO) or Special Operations Group (PFLP-SOG) were organizational names used by Palestinian radical Wadie Haddad when engaging in international attacks, which were not sanctioned by the Popular Front for the Liberation of Palestine (PFLP).

Formation 
A leading member of the Popular Front for the Liberation of Palestine (PFLP) from its inception, Haddad had been banned from organizing attacks on non-Israeli targets after his role in the Dawson's Field hijackings in 1970, which were widely seen as having provoked the Black September crackdown on the Palestine Liberation Organization (PLO) in Jordan.

However, Haddad defied the ban by claiming to carry out his attacks in the name of a PFLP-EO faction, although he remained part of the PFLP. To support him, he solicited the help of non-PFLP organizations such as the Abu Nidal Organization and the West German Revolutionary Cells (RZ). He also employed his PFLP protégé, Ilich Ramírez Sánchez ("Carlos"), who is currently imprisoned in France for terrorist acts committed in 1982-83.

It is unclear to what extent the PFLP-EO formed a faction in the real sense of the word, within the Palestinian nationalist movement. It may simply have been a faction or trend within the PFLP, or possibly a name tag used to shield the PFLP from the political fallout of Haddad's operations.

Downfall 
As discontent grew with Haddad's rogue tactics, and the mainstream PLO pressured the PFLP to cease its international operations, Haddad's position became increasingly precarious. After the botched Entebbe Operation in 1976, when Israel gained worldwide sympathy after rescuing more than one hundred airline passengers held by Haddad's PFLP (or PFLP-EO) men and members of the RZ in Uganda, the PFLP leadership responded by expelling him from the organization. Wadie Haddad died in 1978, in East Berlin, East Germany. This was first reported as being from leukaemia, and later from possible poisoning by Mossad. According to the book Striking Back, published by Aaron J. Klein in 2006, Haddad was assassinated by the Mossad, which had sent the chocolate-loving Haddad Belgian chocolates coated with a slow-acting and undetectable poison which caused him to die severals months later. "It took him a few long months to die", Klein said in the book.

Splinter groups 
 The 15 May Organization
 Popular Front for the Liberation of Palestine – Special Command
 Lebanese Armed Revolutionary Factions

References 

1970s establishments in the Israeli Military Governorate
1976 disestablishments in the Israeli Military Governorate
Arab Nationalist Movement breakaway groups
Defunct Palestinian militant groups
Popular Front for the Liberation of Palestine